Htauk Hlayga was governor of Toungoo (Taungoo) from 1344 to 1347. Prior to becoming governor, he had been a longtime minister serving at the regional court of Toungoo at least since the 1310s. In 1317−18, Hlayga and his elder brother Letya Sekkya negotiated with the forces of Pinya for an agreement that allowed the rebellious governor Thawun Nge to remain in office in exchange for the latter's nominal submission. He became governor by assassinating his brother in 1344 soon after King Kyawswa I assumed power in Toungoo's overlord Pinya. He apparently negotiated a deal with Kyawswa to let him in power but he was assassinated a year and nine months later by another minister, Theingaba.

References

Bibliography
 
 

Pinya dynasty
1347 deaths